Heinz Werner's orthogenetic principle is a foundation for current theories of developmental psychology and developmental psychopathology. Initially proposed in 1940, it was formulated in 1957 and states that "wherever development occurs it proceeds from a state of relative globality and lack of differentiation to a state of increasing differentiation, articulation, and hierarchic integration." It is an example of an organismic theory based on the intrinsic activity of living systems and is parallel to Piaget's genetic epistemology both emphasizing a holistic view of development.

In contrast to stage theories of development such as Sigmund Freud's description of psychosexual development that posited a particular sequence of behavior, Werner's principle provides a direction for development that can be applied to any behavioral domain. He asserted that the principle provided a single framework for understanding change in child psychology, psychopathology, ethnopsychology, and individual differences. He believed that although the content of these areas may be different, there was a formal similarity of the sequences within each domain moving from the global to the hierarchically integrated.

References

Developmental psychology